Maurice Cammage is a French film director and dialoguist, born in 1882 and died on 15 April 1946 in Paris.

Filmography 

 1932 : Vive la classe
 1932 : Un beau jour de noces
 1932 : La Terreur de la pampa (script and dialogues by José de Bérys)
 1932 : Quand tu nous tiens, amour
 1932 : Par habitude
 1932 : Ordonnance malgré lui
 1933 : Le Gros Lot or La Veine d'Anatole
 1933 : Le Coq du régiment
 1934 : Une nuit de folies
 1934 : La Caserne en folie
 1934 : Les Bleus de la marine
 1935 : Un soir de bombe
 1935 : La Mariée du régiment
 1936 : La Petite Dame du wagon-lit
 1936 : Les Maris de ma femme
 1937 : Une femme qui se partage
 1937 : Mon député et sa femme
 1937 : La Belle de Montparnasse
 1938 : L'Innocent 
 1938 : Vacances payées
 1938 : Une de la cavalerie
 1939 : The Five Cents of Lavarede 
 1939 : The Porter from Maxim's 
 1940 : Monsieur Hector
 1941 : Un chapeau de paille d'Italie 
 1942 :  Guignol marionnette de France (short film)
 1943 : Une vie de chien
 1946 : The Faceless Enemy

External links 
 

French film directors
1882 births
1946 deaths